Waldstraßenviertel (English: Forest Street Quarter/Neighbourhood), is a neighbourhood in the north west of Leipzig's borough Mitte in Saxony, Germany. It is considered one of the largest complete areas of Gründerzeit buildings in Europe and is therefore considered of important cultural and heritage status. Many of its buildings are therefore protected or listed.

History 
Originally this area was forest and grassland.

Famous People 
Numerous famous people have lived in the Waldstraßenviertel, many of whom were musicians. Examples are: Albin Ackermann-Teubner, Samuel Agnon, August Bebel, Max Beckmann, Georg Bötticher, Hans Driesch, Bernard Katz, Heinrich August Marschner, Georg Trexler, Auguste Schmidt.

Albert Lortzing composed his opera "The Tsar and the woodworker" in a garden house in the Funkenburg.

Gustav Mahler lived from 1887 to 1888 in number 12 Gustav-Adolf-Straße and wrote his first symphony there among others.

External links 

 Waldstraßenviertel in Leipzig-Lexicon
 Residents club of Waldstraßenviertel

Geography of Leipzig
Neighbourhoods in Germany